"Charleston" is a song by Italian singer Den Harrow, released in 1986 as the fourth single from his 1985 debut studio album Overpower. The song was written by Tom Hooker, and produced by Roberto Turatti and Michele Chieregato. It peaked at No. 8 in his native Italy. The song also charted in West Germany and France, peaking at No. 18 and No. 27, respectively. In Switzerland, the song reached No. 17.

Track listing 

 Italian 7-inch single

A. "Charleston" – 4:00
B. "Broken Radio" – 4:10

 Italian 12-inch single

A. "Charleston" – 7:11
B. "Bad Boy (Remix)" – 9:18

 German 12-inch maxi single

A. "Charleston" – 7:09
B. "Bad Boy (Remix)" – 10:06

Charts

Weekly charts

References

External links 

 

1986 songs
1986 singles
Baby Records singles
Den Harrow songs
Songs written by Tom Hooker